Yuri Markhel (born 9 January 1979) is a former Belarusian footballer.

Career
Yuri Markhel has been one of the most prolific goalscorers of Belarusian First League. In May 2013 he had scored his 100th First League goal. After retirement in 2015, he started working as a youth coach. 

He is a younger brother of Mikhail Markhel. In June 2019, his brother Mikhail was appointed as manager of the Belarusian national team and Yuri joined his coaching staff.

References

External links
 
 
 Profile at Gomel website

1979 births
Living people
Belarusian footballers
Belarusian expatriate footballers
Expatriate footballers in Russia
Expatriate footballers in Ukraine
Belarusian expatriate sportspeople in Ukraine
Expatriate footballers in Kazakhstan
Russian Premier League players
FC SKVICH Minsk players
FC Spartak Vladikavkaz players
FC Torpedo-BelAZ Zhodino players
FC Metalurh Zaporizhzhia players
FC Gomel players
FC Kyzylzhar players
FC Naftan Novopolotsk players
FC Energetik-BGU Minsk players
FC Gorodeya players
FC Smorgon players
Association football forwards